The Strongest Instinct (German:Der stärkste Trieb) is a 1922 German silent film directed by Karl Grune.

It is probably the same film as Karl Grune's Die Jagd nach der Wahrheit (1921) with Fritz Kortner and Rudolf Forster.

References

Bibliography
 James Robert Parish & Kingsley Canham. Film Directors Guide: Western Europe. Scarecrow Press, 1976.

External links

1922 films
Films of the Weimar Republic
Films directed by Karl Grune
German silent feature films
German black-and-white films